Saidabad (also Romanized as Sa‘īdābād; also known as S‘adābād and Sa‘dābād) is a village in Asgariyeh Rural District, in the Central District of Pishva County, Tehran Province, Iran. At the 2006 census, its population was 526, in 118 families.

References 

Populated places in Pishva County